St Stephens by Launceston Rural is a civil parish in the east of Cornwall, England, United Kingdom. It is in the Registration district of Launceston. The population of the parish in the 2001 census was 312, increasing to 360 and including Dutson at the 2011 census.  The former parish of St Stephens by Launceston was abolished in 1894: St Stephens by Launceston Urban became part of the town of Launceston, while St Stephens by Launceston Rural became part of Launceston Rural District.

The parish lies immediately north west of the town of Launceston and is bounded to the south by the parishes of Launceston, St Thomas the Apostle Rural, and Lawhitton. To the east it is bounded by the River Tamar (the border between Cornwall and Devon). To the north and north-west it is bordered by the parishes of Werrington, North Petherwin and Egloskerry.

History 
In Anglo-Saxon times there was a monastery here dedicated to St Stephen whose canons owned the surrounding land including the town of Launceston (i.e. Lan-stefan-ton) (the name did not then belong to Dunheved the present town). A mint was established here as early as the reign of Aethelred II, 976, but only one specimen is known to exist (it weighs 1.61g). However, after the Norman Conquest the Norman Earl acquired Dunheved and rebuilt the castle there. He expropriated the market and mint of the canons and the townspeople followed them to Dunheved. (The name of Launceston belonged originally to the monastery and town here, but was then transferred to the town of Dunheved.) The church of St Stephen  retained its importance and remained the mother church of many of the surrounding parishes, Tremaine, Egloskerry, Tresmeer, Werrington, St Giles, Laneast, St Thomas, St Mary Magdalene and others throughout the Middle Ages.

Notable buildings 
The church's buttressed and battlemented tower (16th century) houses a ring of six bells. The church was built in the early 13th century after the monastery which had been on this site had moved into the valley near the castle. The old tower was demolished by Reginald Earl of Cornwall. The present fine tower was built in the 16th century; the font is Norman. On the Tamar at Yeolmbridge is the oldest bridge in Cornwall: it has two pointed arches and the roadway has been widened in modern times.

Notable residents
Joan Rendell, historian, resided at Yeolmbridge in the latter part of her life.

References

Civil parishes in Cornwall
Villages in Cornwall
Launceston, Cornwall